John Leonard Duncan Mackenzie (22 May 1928 – 8 June 2011) was a Scottish film director who worked in British film from the late 1960s, first as an assistant director and later as an independent director himself.

Early life
Mackenzie was born in Edinburgh, where he attended Holy Cross Academy. He studied history at the University of Edinburgh. He studied drama and joined Edinburgh's Gateway Theatre Company. He worked as a teacher and moved to London in 1960.

Career

Early career
He began his career with Ken Loach, acting as the latter's assistant director on such works as Up the Junction (1965) and Cathy Come Home (1966). This training allowed Mackenzie to begin a move into directing himself, as well as teaching him the skills of working on location with non-professional, local actors to a tight budget and schedule.

Directing, film and television
Initially, Mackenzie worked on television plays, following his apprenticeship with Loach. During this period he directed episodes of The Jazz Age and ITV Saturday Night Theatre. His first film was the television drama There Is Also Tomorrow (1969), followed by two feature films One Brief Summer (1970) and Unman, Wittering and Zigo, an adaptation of Giles Cooper's radio play (1971). Mackenzie still largely worked for television, aside from the independent production Made (1972), until in 1979 he directed the highly acclaimed A Sense of Freedom, a BAFTA-nominated film (released on television in the US in 1985). Freedom was surpassed, however, by Mackenzie's next film, the gangster piece The Long Good Friday, generally accepted as his masterpiece.

The Long Good Friday, starring Bob Hoskins and Helen Mirren, opened up opportunities to work in the United States. The Honorary Consul was adapted from Graham Greene's novel by Christopher Hampton. Also released as Beyond the Limit, the film re-united Mackenzie with Hoskins, as well as giving him the chance to direct Michael Caine and Richard Gere. Mackenzie's other films of this period include The Innocent (1985) and The Fourth Protocol (1987).

The greatest success that Mackenzie enjoyed in his American period was Ruby (1992), a biopic of Jack Ruby, the Texan nightclub owner who assassinated Lee Harvey Oswald. Ruby starred Academy Award-nominated Danny Aiello and Twin Peaks actor Sherilyn Fenn.

Another film of this period was The Last of the Finest, a UK-US thriller starring Brian Dennehy. Mackenzie returned to the UK in 1993. He later directed films such as Deadly Voyage (1996) and When the Sky Falls (2000).

Death
Mackenzie died following a stroke on 8 June 2011, some three weeks after his 83rd birthday. He is survived by his three daughters (Colyn, Katherine and Rebecca) by Wendy Marshall, whom he married in 1956 and who predeceased him.

Filmography
As Assistant Director
Up the Junction, directed by Ken Loach
Cathy Come Home, directed by Loach

As Director: Film

One Brief Summer (1970)
Unman, Wittering and Zigo (1971)
Made (1972)
The Long Good Friday (1980)
A Sense of Freedom (1981)
The Honorary Consul, also released as Beyond the Limit (1983)

The Innocent (1985)
The Fourth Protocol (1987)
The Last of the Finest, also released as Blue Heat and Street Legal (1990)
Ruby (1992)
When the Sky Falls (2000)
Quicksand (2003)

As Director: Television

The Cheviot, the Stag, and the Black Black Oil BBC (1973)
Shutdown BBC (1974)
Just Another Saturday BBC (1975)
Double Dare (BBC 1976)
A Passage to England BBC (1976)
Red Shift BBC (1977)

Just a Boys' Game BBC (1979)
Act of Vengeance HBO (1986)
Voyage, also broadcast as Cruise of Fear US (1993)
The Infiltrator, also broadcast as In Hitler's Shadow HBO (1995)
Deadly Voyage HBO (1996)
Looking After Jo Jo (1998)
 Aldrich Ames: Traitor Within Showtime (1998)
Avenger (2004)

References

External links
 
 

1928 births
2011 deaths
Scottish film directors
Alumni of the University of Edinburgh
People educated at St Augustine's High School, Edinburgh
Prix Italia winners
Place of death missing